The United Nations Educational, Scientific and Cultural Organization (UNESCO) established in 1972 is engaged in the protection and preservation of cultural or natural heritage.

There are 6 UNESCO World Heritage Sites in Saudi Arabia inscribed from 2008 to 2021.

Location of sites

List of sites

References 



Saudi Arabia geography-related lists
Saudi Arabia
World Heritage Sites